is a city located in Nagano Prefecture, Japan. , the city had an estimated population of 42,664 in 15649 households, and a population density of 380 persons per km².

Geography
Located in the northern end of the Zennoji Plain of northern Nagano prefecture, Nakano is located on the Chikuma River and is surrounded by mountains. The weather in Nakano varies greatly over the seasons.

Surrounding municipalities
Nagano Prefecture
 Iiyama
 Nagano
 Obuse
 Takayama
 Yamanouchi
 Kijimadaira
 Iizuna

Climate
Nakano has a climate characterized by characterized by hot and humid summers, and relatively mild winters (Köppen climate classification Cfa).  The average annual temperature in Nakano is 12.2 °C. The average annual rainfall is 1406 mm with September as the wettest month. The temperatures are highest on average in August, at around 25.6 °C, and lowest in January, at around -0.4 °C.

Demographics
Per Japanese census data, the population of Nakano has remained relatively constant over the past 70 years.

History
The area of present-day Nakano was part of ancient Shinano Province. The area was part of the tenryō (direct holdings) of the Tokugawa shogunate during the Edo period and was administered from Nakano jin'ya. Nakano was the capital of "Nakano Prefecture" form 1870 to 1871, when it was merged with Nagano Prefecture. The modern town of Nakano was established on April 1, 1889 with the establishment of the municipalities system. It was elevated to city status on July 1, 1955 by the merger of the town with neighboring villages of Hino, Entoku, Nagaoka, Hiraoka, Takaoka, Shinano, and Yamato.

On April 1, 2005, the village of Toyota (from Shimominochi District) was merged into Nakano.

Government
Nakano has a mayor-council form of government with a directly elected mayor and a unicameral city legislature of 20 members.

Economy
The city of Nakano is supported largely by its agricultural industry. Nakano boasts high quality fruits and vegetables, including Fuji apples, Kyohō grapes, peaches, pears, rice, asparagus, and mushrooms. It is Japan's largest producer of Enokitake mushrooms.  The city is also well known for its roses. The biannual rose festival in Ippongi Park displays thousands of rose plants, and attracts tourists from all over Japan. Nakano City has experienced significant growth since the Nagano 1998 Winter Olympics. Located near many popular ski areas, Nakano's economy is augmented by the ski-tourism industry.

Nakano is home to Cosina Co., Ltd, a designer and manufacturer of camera and lenses.

Education
Nakano has 11 public elementary schools and four public middle schools run by the city. There are two public high schools under the Nagano Prefectural Board of Education.

Transportation

Railway
 East Japan Railway Company - Iiyama Line
  -  
 Nagano Electric Railway – Nagano Line
 -  -  -  -

Highway
 Jōshin-etsu Expressway

Local attractions
Takanashi clan fortified residence, a Sengoku-period National Historic Site

Sports teams
In 2007, Nakano became home to the Shinano Grand Serows, a baseball team in the Japanese BC League (Baseball Challenge League).

Notable people from Nakano
Tetsuo Nagata, cinematographer
Joe Hisaishi, composer and musical director

References

External links 

Official Website 

 
Cities in Nagano Prefecture